Local access and transport area (LATA) is a term used in U.S. telecommunications regulation.  It represents a geographical area of the United States under the terms of the Modification of Final Judgment (MFJ) entered by the United States District Court for the District of Columbia in Civil Action number 82-0192 or any other geographic area designated as a LATA in the National Exchange Carrier Association, Inc. Tariff FCC No. 4. that precipitated the breakup of the original AT&T into the "Baby Bells" or created since that time for wireline regulation.

Generally, a LATA represents an area within which a divested Regional Bell Operating Company (RBOC) is permitted to offer exchange telecommunications and exchange access services. Under the terms of the MFJ, the RBOCs are generally prohibited from providing services that originate in one LATA and terminate in another.

LATA boundaries tend to be drawn around markets, and not necessarily along existing state or area code borders. Some LATAs cross over state boundaries, such as those for the New York metropolitan area and Greenwich, Connecticut; Chicago, Illinois; Portland, Oregon; and areas between Maryland, Virginia, and West Virginia. Area codes and LATAs do not necessarily share boundaries; many LATAs exist in multiple area codes, and many area codes exist in multiple LATAs.

Originally, the LATAs were grouped into regions within which one particular RBOC was allowed to provide services. The LATAs in each of these regions are numbered beginning with the same digit. Generally, the LATAs were associated with carriers or other indications in the following manner:

In addition to this list, two local carriers were made independent: Cincinnati Bell in the Cincinnati area, and SNET (a former unit of AT&T, sold to Frontier) in Connecticut. These were assigned LATAs in the 9xx range.

Since the breakup of the original AT&T in 1984, however, some amount of deregulation, as well as a number of phone company mergers, have blurred the significance of these regions. A number of new LATAs have been formed within these regions since their inception, most beginning with the digit 9.

LATAs contribute to an often confusing aspect of long-distance telephone service. Due to the various and overlapping regulatory limitations and inter-business arrangements, phone companies typically provide differing types of “long distance” service, each with potentially different rates:
 within same LATA, within same state
 within same LATA, between different states
 between different LATAs, within same state
 between different LATAs, between different states
Given the complexity of the legal and financial issues involved in each distinction, many long-distance companies tend to not explain the details of these different rates, which can lead to billing questions from surprised customers.

Local carriers have various alternative terms for LATAs such as “Service Area” by Pacific Bell in California, or “Regional Calling Area” by Verizon in Maryland.

To facilitate the sharing of Telcordia telephone routing databases between countries, LATAs were later defined for the provinces of Canada, the other countries and territories of the North American Numbering Plan, and Mexico. Aside from U.S. territories, LATAs have no regulatory purpose in these areas. In 2000, the Canadian Radio-television and Telecommunications Commission eliminated all Canadian provincial LATAs in favor of a single LATA for Canada (888).

No LATAs exist with a second digit of 0 or 1, which distinguished them from traditional area codes.

List of LATAs

US state LATAs
The city or place name given with some LATAs is the name given to identify the LATA, not the limit of its boundary. Generally this is the most significant metropolitan area in the LATA. In some cases, a LATA is named after the largest phone exchange in the LATA that was historically served by an RBOC. For example, the largest city in the Pahrump LATA in Nevada is Las Vegas. Since Las Vegas was not historically served by an RBOC, the LATA is named after the smaller town of Pahrump, which was historically served by Nevada Bell (now AT&T Inc.). Also, listing under a state does not necessarily limit the LATA's territory to that state; there may be overlaps as well as enclaves. Areas that include notable portions of other states are explained, but not all LATA state overlaps may be detailed.

LATA boundaries are not always solidly defined. Inter-carrier agreements, change proposals to the Federal Communications Commission (FCC), and new wiring developments into rural areas can and do often alter the effective borders between LATAs. Many sources on LATA boundary information conflict with each other at detailed levels. Telcordia data may provide the most up-to-date details of LATA inclusions.

Alabama
 476 Birmingham
 477 Huntsville
 478 Montgomery
Includes Georgetown, Georgia
 480 Mobile
Includes areas of Mississippi north of Pascagoula
Includes parts of northern Escambia County, Florida in the Century and Walnut Hill areas

Alaska
 832

Arizona
 666 Phoenix
 Includes Winterhaven, California
 Includes Spirit Mountain, Nevada
 Includes Glen Canyon, Utah
 668 Tucson
 Includes Rodeo and Virden, New Mexico
 980 Navajo Nation (Arizona portion)
 Includes southwestern San Juan County, Utah

Arkansas
 526 Fort Smith
 Includes part of Oklahoma from Pocola to Moffett
 Includes section of Oklahoma from Colcord to Watts
 Includes small part of Barry County, Missouri
 Includes area of Oklahoma near Maysville, Arkansas
 Includes area of Oklahoma near Uniontown, Arkansas
 528 Little Rock
 Includes Watson, Oklahoma
 530 Pine Bluff
 Includes Junction City, Louisiana

California
 722 San Francisco
 724 Chico
 726 Sacramento
 728 Fresno
 730 Los Angeles
 Includes La Paz County, Arizona
 732 San Diego
 734 Bakersfield
 736 Monterey
 738 Stockton
 740 San Luis Obispo
 973 Palm Springs

Colorado
 656 Denver
 658 Colorado Springs

Connecticut
 920

Washington, D.C.
236
 Includes the west portion of the West Bay of Maryland, as far north as Damascus, Maryland (roughly Montgomery, Prince George's, Charles, and St. Mary's counties of Maryland)
 Includes the northeasternmost portion of Virginia, from Sterling to just north of Fredericksburg (roughly Northern Virginia)

Florida

 448 Pensacola
 Includes Clear Springs, Wing and Florala, Alabama
 450 Panama City
 Includes a small portion of Georgia near Tallahassee
 452 Jacksonville
 454 Gainesville
 456 Daytona Beach
 458 Orlando
 460 Southeast Florida
 939 Fort Myers
 952 Tampa
 953 Tallahassee
Florida is a special case in which state regulators have also assigned 5-digit LATA codes which overlay the Federally-assigned 3-digit LATAs. See map on the right for details. Some carriers refer to these by the 3-digit LATA, others by the 5-digit.

Georgia
 438 Atlanta
 Includes portion of Alabama from Oakland to Huguley
 Includes Phenix City, Alabama
 Includes Ranburne, Alabama
 440 Savannah
 Includes part of southern South Carolina as far north as Hardeeville and Hilton Head Island
 442 Augusta
 Includes Aiken County and Edgefield County, South Carolina
 444 Albany
 446 Macon

Hawaii
 834

Idaho
 652 Southern Idaho
 Includes Malheur County, Oregon, especially the Ontario area
 Includes Jackpot, Jarbidge, and Owyhee, Nevada
 Includes Alta and Border, Wyoming
 960 Coeur d'Alene
 Includes part of northwest Montana as far east as Eureka and as far south as Libby
 Includes Pullman, Washington and surrounding area
 Includes Pend Oreille County, Washington

Illinois
 358 Chicago
 Includes Lake County and Newton County, Indiana, especially the Gary, Indiana area
 Includes Demotte, Hebron, and Lakes of the Four Seasons, Indiana
 Extends into Wisconsin Salem Township
 360 Rockford
 Extends into Wisconsin near Apple River, Illinois
 362 Cairo
 364 Sterling
 366 Forrest
 368 Peoria
 370 Champaign
 May include areas of Indiana near Danville, Illinois
 374 Springfield
 376 Quincy
 976 Mattoon
 977 Macomb
 978 Olney

Indiana
 330 Evansville
 332 South Bend
 334 Auburn-Huntington
 336 Indianapolis
 Extends into Illinois near Dana, Indiana
 338 Bloomington
 937 Richmond
 Includes Union City, Ohio
 938 Terre Haute
 Includes Edgar and Clark counties of Illinois
 May include Robinson, Illinois

Iowa
 630 Sioux City
 Extends into Minnesota near incorporated areas of Iowa along its length
 Includes the eastern portions of Dakota and Thurston counties of Nebraska
 Includes North Sioux City, South Dakota, and extends into South Dakota near Akron and Hawarden, Iowa
 632 Des Moines
 Extends into Missouri from Andover, Missouri to south of Davis City, Iowa
 634 Davenport
 Includes portion of Illinois as far as Geneseo and Aledo
 Includes the Galena, Illinois area
 635 Cedar Rapids

Kansas
524 Kansas City (see Missouri for details)
532 Wichita
534 Topeka

Kentucky
 462 Louisville
 Includes the central southern area of Indiana around Salem
 464 Owensboro
 466 Winchester

Louisiana
 492 Baton Rouge
 486 Shreveport
 488 Lafayette
 490 New Orleans

Maine
 120

Maryland
 236 see Washington, D.C.; most of this LATA is actually in Maryland
 238 Baltimore
 240 Hagerstown
 Includes the easternmost part of West Virginia around Martinsburg as far as Route 9
 Includes the northwestern part of the Eastern Panhandle of West Virginia including Keyser, from Grant County to Short Gap
 Includes area of Pennsylvania just north of Hancock, Maryland
 242 Salisbury

Massachusetts
 126 Western Massachusetts
 128 Eastern Massachusetts

Michigan
 340 Detroit
 342 Upper Peninsula of Michigan
 Includes portion of Wisconsin around Iron Mountain, Michigan as far as Rhinelander and Townsend, Wisconsin
 344 Saginaw
 346 Lansing
 348 Grand Rapids

Minnesota
 620 Rochester
 624 Duluth
 626 St. Cloud
 628 Minneapolis
 636 Brainerd, Minnesota-Fargo, North Dakota

Mississippi
 482 Jackson
 Includes parts of Alabama around Columbus, Mississippi
 484 Biloxi

Missouri
 520 St. Louis
 Includes part of south-central Illinois southwest of Springfield.
 521 Westphalia (per locallingguide.com, includes Columbia MO)
 522 Springfield
 524 Kansas City
 Includes eastern portion of Kansas as far out as U.S. 73 and U.S. 59 and south as far as U.S. 54
  521 Central Missouri: Columbia and surrounding areas

Montana
 648 Great Falls
 650 Billings
 963 Kalispell (historical)
note: LATA 963 appears on many LATA lists, and at least one map, but is no longer a separate LATA-equivalent area. It is now part of LATA 648.

Nebraska
 644 Omaha
 646 Grand Island
 958 Lincoln

Nevada
 720 Reno
 May include Alpine, Verdi and Coleville, California
 721 Pahrump

New Hampshire
 122
 Includes part of Vermont around Groton
 Includes part of Maine around Kittery and Wilsons Mills

New Jersey
 220 Atlantic Coastal New Jersey
 222 Delaware Valley
 224 North Jersey

New Mexico
 664

New York
132 New York City and surrounding metropolitan area
 Includes Greenwich, Connecticut
133 Poughkeepsie
 Includes Milford, Pennsylvania and surrounding area
134 Albany
 Includes Hancock, Massachusetts
136 Syracuse
138 Binghamton
 Includes Sayre, Pennsylvania and surrounding area
140 Buffalo
 Includes Ulysses, Pennsylvania and surrounding area
921 Fishers Island
974 Rochester

North Carolina
420 Asheville
422 Charlotte
 Includes York County and Lancaster County, South Carolina
424 Greensboro-Winston-Salem area
426 Raleigh
428 Wilmington
949 Fayetteville
951 Rocky Mount

North Dakota
636 Brainerd, Minnesota-Fargo, North Dakota
638 Bismarck
Includes portions of Montana near Beach and Squaw Gap, North Dakota

Ohio
320 Cleveland
322 Youngstown
324 Columbus
325 Akron
326 Toledo
328 Dayton
922 Cincinnati
 Includes Rising Sun, Indiana and surrounding area
 Includes the northern tip of Kentucky as far south as Williamstown
923 Lima-Mansfield

Oklahoma
536 Oklahoma City
538 Tulsa

Oregon
670 Eugene
672 Portland
 Includes Southwestern Washington from Willapa Bay to Goldendale

Pennsylvania
226 Harrisburg
228 Philadelphia
230 Altoona
232 Wilkes-Barre/Scranton
234 Pittsburgh
924 Erie

Rhode Island
130 Rhode Island

South Carolina
430 Greenville
 Includes Polk County, North Carolina
432 Florence
434 Columbia
436 Charleston

South Dakota
640

Tennessee
468 Memphis
 Includes part of Mississippi from south of Memphis to as far south as Hernando
470 Nashville
472 Chattanooga
 Includes northwestern tip of Georgia
474 Knoxville
956 Bristol-Kingsport-Johnson City
 Includes part of Virginia from Abingdon to Wytheville

Texas
540 El Paso
542 Midland
544 Lubbock
546 Amarillo
 Includes the southern half of the Oklahoma Panhandle
548 Wichita Falls
550 Abilene
552 Dallas
554 Longview
 Includes Miller County, Arkansas
556 Waco
558 Austin
560 Houston
562 Beaumont
564 Corpus Christi
566 San Antonio
568 Brownsville
570 Hearne
961 San Angelo

Utah
660 Utah
 May include Mesquite and Partoun, Nevada
 May include Fredonia and Colorado City, Arizona
981 Navajo Nation (Utah portion)

Vermont
124 Vermont
 Includes West Lebanon and West Chesterfield, New Hampshire

Virginia
236 Arlington, Fairfax, Prince William, and Stafford counties, and enclosed cities. See Washington, D.C.
244 Roanoke
246 Culpeper
248 Richmond
250 Lynchburg
252 Norfolk
927 Harrisonburg
928 Charlottesville
929 Edinburg
932 (Shared with WV)

Washington
674 Seattle
676 Spokane
 Includes parts of Oregon including Milton-Freewater and Troy
 Includes a section of Idaho from Lewiston to Grangeville, up to Troy, and Elk City
 Includes Tensed, Idaho

West Virginia
254 Charleston
256 Clarksburg
240 Martinsburg
932 (overlap with VA)

Wisconsin
350 Northeast Wisconsin
 Includes the southern corner of Michigan's Upper Peninsula
352 Northwest Wisconsin
354 Southwest Wisconsin
356 Southeast Wisconsin

Wyoming
654 Wyoming

U.S. territory LATAs

American Samoa - 884
Guam - 871
Northern Mariana Islands - 870
Puerto Rico - 820
U.S. Virgin Islands - 822
Wake Island - 836

Non-U.S. LATAs (non-regulatory)

Mexico - 838
Bahamas - 824
Jamaica - 826
Dominican Republic - 828
Other Caribbean - 830
Canada - 888

Canada 
As LATAs exist for US regulatory purposes, where they serve as a demarcation between intra-LATA calls (handled by regional Bell operating companies) and inter-LATA calls (handled by interstate long-distance carriers such as AT&T), they have no legal significance in Canada.

As of 2000, all of Canada (except for non-geographic numbers) is identified as LATA 888.

The use of this LATA set to identify individual provinces is therefore deprecated:
Alberta - 881, 884
British Columbia - 886
Manitoba - 888
New Brunswick - 890
Newfoundland - 885
Nova Scotia/P.E.I. -  887, 889
Ontario - 851
Quebec - 850, 883
Saskatchewan - 891
Yukon Territory - 892

Local interconnection region
Canada does define local interconnection regions (LIR's), which determine where points of interconnection (POI) must be provided by competing local exchange and mobile carriers to provide local number portability. A Canadian LIR is geographically smaller than a US LATA, typically comparable in size to a small city's flat-rate local calling area or to an entire large regional municipality. In areas where a small-city Digital Multiplex System controls a group of remote switching centres, one for each surrounding village, the local interconnect region normally includes each exchange in the city plus all downstream remotes of those exchanges. In a Toronto-sized city, the LIR will include only the city itself.

While the LIRs resemble local calling areas in geographic size, there are some key differences:
 LIR's normally do not include incumbent local independent telephone company exchanges in locations not opened to competition, where the independent numbers are currently not portable.
 LIR's do not cross provincial boundaries. Lloydminster has an LIR for each province, as does Ottawa-Hull.
 LIR's closely follow network topology, which often does not match a local flat-rate calling area as local calling is defined by arbitrary regulatory constructs.

One example: The tiny unincorporated village of Beebe Plain, divided by the Quebec-Vermont border, is served by +1-819-876 Rock Island, Quebec, Canada (a remote station controlled from Magog) and +1-802-873 Derby Line, Vermont, USA (a remote station controlled from St. Johnsbury). Magog and St. Johnsbury are both a long-distance call from anywhere in Beebe Plain, even though Canadian subscribers can place local calls to Sherbrooke, US subscribers can locally call Newport and an international call within the village is local. An LIR assignment which follows network topology places the Canadian remote station in Magog's LIR, not Sherbrooke's LIR.

See also
Modification of Final Judgment
Regional Bell Operating Company
Local Exchange Routing Guide
Telcordia

Notes

External link
Telephony